Puntukas is the second-largest boulder in Lithuania. It was believed to be the largest stone in Lithuania until the discovery of Barstyčiai stone in the Skuodas district in 1957.

Puntukas is a glacial erratic—it was brought by glaciers during the last glacial period (18th–12th millennium BC) probably from Finland. It weighs about 265 tons. It is made of Rapakivi granite. Its reddish mass includes large crystals of potassium feldspar surrounded by green rings of oligoclase.

In 1943, sculptor Bronius Pundzius engraved portraits and quotes from last wills of Lithuanian pilots Steponas Darius and Stasys Girėnas for the 10th anniversary of their deaths during the transatlantic flight with Lituanica. A local legend has it that velnias (a devil in the Lithuanian mythology) carried the stone to destroy the Anykščiai Church, however a rooster crowed. The devil disappeared back into the underworld, leaving only Puntukas behind. The legend was featured in the famous poem Anykščių šilelis by Antanas Baranauskas. According to another story, a brave Lithuanian warrior Puntukas was killed and was burned (a usual pagan custom) on the stone; since then it is known as Puntukas stone. Other legends claim that the stone was a pagan shrine and that oaks growing around are relics of the sacred groves.

References

Natural monuments of Lithuania
Glacial erratics in Lithuania
Anykščiai District Municipality